The 2020 United States House of Representatives elections in Louisiana were held on November 3, 2020, to elect the six U.S. representatives from the state of Louisiana, one from each of the state's six congressional districts. The elections coincided with other elections to the House of Representatives, elections to the United States Senate, and various state and local elections.

Like most Louisiana elections, these were conducted using a jungle primary that occurred on November 3, where all candidates ran on the same ballot in the primary, regardless of party. Any candidate who earned an absolute majority of the vote in the primary would be automatically declared the winner of the election. However, if in any given congressional district no candidate gained an absolute majority of the votes, a runoff election between the top two candidates within said congressional district would have been held on December 5. The  was the only one that did not have its incumbent run for re-election, and also held the only runoff election.

Overview

District 1

The 1st district is based in the suburbs of New Orleans, spanning from the northern shore of Lake Pontchartrain south to the Mississippi River delta. The incumbent is Republican Steve Scalise, who was re-elected with 71.5% of the vote in 2018.

Candidates

Declared
Lee Ann Dugas (Democratic), activist and perennial candidate
Howard Kearney (Libertarian), computer programmer
Steve Scalise (Republican), incumbent U.S. Representative

General election

Predictions

Results

District 2

The 2nd district stretches from New Orleans to inner Baton Rouge. The seat is currently vacant following the resignation of incumbent Democrat Cedric Richmond on Jan. 15, who was re-elected with 80.8% of the vote in 2018.

Candidates

Declared
Belden "Noonie Man" Batiste (Independent), activist and perennial candidate
Glenn Adrain Harris (Democratic)
Colby James (Independent), U.S. Army veteran
Cedric Richmond (Democratic), incumbent U.S. Representative
David Schilling (Republican)
Sheldon Vincent (Republican), retired postal worker

General election

Predictions

Results

District 3

The 3rd district encompasses southwestern Louisiana, taking in Lake Charles and Lafayette. The incumbent is Republican Clay Higgins, who was re-elected with 55.7% of the vote in 2018.

Candidates

Declared
Rob Anderson (Democratic), construction worker
Braylon Harris (Democratic), pastor
Clay Higgins (Republican), incumbent U.S. Representative
Brandon Leleux (Libertarian), restaurant manager

General election

Predictions

Results

District 4

The 4th district encompasses northwestern Louisiana, taking in the Shreveport–Bossier City metropolitan area. The incumbent is Republican Mike Johnson, who was re-elected with 64.2% of the vote in 2018.

Candidates

Declared
Ben Gibson (Republican), firefighter
Kenny Houston (Democratic), small business owner
Mike Johnson (Republican), incumbent U.S. Representative
Ryan Trundle (Democratic), progressive activist

General election

Predictions

Results

District 5

The 5th district encompasses rural northeastern Louisiana, central Louisiana, as well as the northern part of Louisiana's Florida parishes in southeast Louisiana, taking in Monroe, Alexandria, Opelousas, Amite and Bogalusa, LA. On February 26, 2020, Republican incumbent Ralph Abraham announced he would not be seeking re-election for a fourth term, honoring his pledge to only serve three terms in Congress. Luke Letlow, Abraham's former Chief of Staff, was elected to the seat on December 5, 2020. He was scheduled to assume office on January 3, 2021, but died on December 29, 2020, of complications from COVID-19. A special election for this seat was held on March 20, 2021, which was won by Letlow's widow, Julia.

Candidates

Declared
Allen Guillory, Sr. (Republican)
Lance Harris (Republican), state representative
Matt Hasty (Republican)
Jesse P. Lagarde (Democratic)
Martin Lemelle (Democratic), executive vice president of Grambling State University
Luke Letlow (Republican), former Chief of Staff to U.S. Representative Ralph Abraham
Scotty Robinson (Republican), Ouachita Parish police juror
Candy Shoemaker-Cristophe (Democratic), social worker
Phillip Snowden (Democratic)

Declined
 Ralph Abraham, incumbent U.S. Representative

General election

Predictions

Jungle primary

Runoff

District 6

The 6th district encompasses the suburbs of Baton Rouge. The incumbent is Republican Garret Graves, who was re-elected with 69.5% of the vote in 2018.

Candidates

Declared
Garret Graves (Republican), incumbent U.S. Representative
Dartanyon Williams (Democratic)
Shannon Sloan (Libertarian)
Richard Torregano (Independent), retired electrical technician

General election

Predictions

Results

See also
 2020 Louisiana elections

References

External links
 
 
  (State affiliate of the U.S. League of Women Voters)
 
 . (Guidance to help voters get to the polls; addresses transport, childcare, work, information challenges)

Official campaign websites for 1st district candidates
 Howard Kearney (L) for Congress
 Steve Scalise (R) for Congress

Official campaign websites for 2nd district candidates
 Belden "Noonie Man" Batiste (I) for Congress
 Cedric Richmond (D) for Congress

Official campaign websites for 3rd district candidates
 Rob Anderson (D) for Congress 
 Braylon Harris (D) for Congress
 Clay Higgins (R) for Congress
 Brandon Leleux (L) for Congress

Official campaign websites for 4th district candidates
 Ben Gibson (R) for Congress 
 Kenny Houston (D) for Congress
 Mike Johnson (R) for Congress
 Ryan Trundle (D) for Congress

Official campaign websites for 5th district candidates
 Lance Harris (R) for Congress 
 Matt Hasty (R) for Congress
 Martin Lemelle (D) for Congress
 Luke Letlow (R) for Congress
 Scotty Robinson (R) for Congress
 Candy Shoemaker-Cristophe (D) for Congress 

Official campaign websites for 6th district candidates
 Garret Graves (R) for Congress
 Shannon Sloan (L) for Congress
 Richard Torregano (I) for Congress
 Dartanyon Williams (D) for Congress

2020
Louisiana
United States House of Representatives